K-171 is a state highway in the southeastern part of the U.S. state of Kansas. The  highway mostly lies on the Crawford County/Cherokee County line except for the easternmost  of the highway when it is entirely in Cherokee County. Its western terminus is at the intersection of U.S. Route 69 (US-69), US-160 and US-400 south of Pittsburg and its eastern terminus is a continuation as Missouri Route 171 at the Missouri state line  near Opolis. K-171's current route was established on May 14, 2003, and the routing has not changed since.

Route description

K-171 begins at a four-way stop south of Pittsburg. The west arm of this intersection serves as US-400, the north arm carries US-69 and US-160, the south arm is US-69, US-160, and US-400, and the east arm forms the beginning of K-171. From this intersection, the highway heads due east to Opolis. The highway begins to curve to the south just before crossing the state line and becoming Route 171 at the Missouri border. The entire route travels through mostly rural fields.

The Kansas Department of Transportation (KDOT) tracks the traffic levels on its highways, and in 2019, they determined that on average the traffic varied from 7,180 vehicles per day near the western terminus to 7,650 vehicles per day near the eastern terminus. 
The entire length of K-171 is included in the National Highway System. The National Highway System is a system of highways important to the nation's defense, economy, and mobility. The first  of the route is paved with composite pavement, while the remaining  is paved with full design bituminous pavement.

History
In a May 14, 2003 resolution, it was approved to truncate K-57 to end at US-169 by Colony. At this time K-171 was established along the former section of K-57 between US-69 and the Missouri border. The highway's route has stayed the same since it was commissioned. For several years there was a western K-171 from the city of Bushton to K-4. This western K-171 was decommissioned in 2010.

Major intersections

References

171
Transportation in Cherokee County, Kansas
Transportation in Crawford County, Kansas